The Vaikunda Avatara Orvalam or Vaikunda Jayanthi Orvalam is the name given to the procession which originates from Nagercoil to Swamithoppe. This is held annually on the day of Lord Narayana's tenth incarnation as Ayya Vaikundar, according to the teachings of Akilattirattu Ammanai, the holy text of Ayyavazhi religion.  See also Ayya vaikundar avataram.

See also
Ayyavazhi mythology
List of Ayyavazhi-related articles

Ayyavazhi